Kodachrome is the brand name for a color reversal film introduced by Eastman Kodak in 1935. It was one of the first successful color materials and was used for both cinematography and still photography. For many years, Kodachrome was widely used for professional color photography, especially for images intended for publication in print media. 

Because of its complex processing requirements, the film was initially exclusively sold process-paid in the United States: customers had to pay Kodak for the cost of development when they bought the film, and independent photography stores were prohibited from developing Kodachrome photos. To develop the film, customers had to mail film to Kodak, who mailed the developed photos back for no additional charge. In 1954, the U.S. Department of Justice found this practice to be an uncompetitive violation of antitrust law. Kodak entered into a consent decree -  this required the company to offer Kodachrome film for sale with and without the development fee, as well as license Kodachrome development patents to independent photography stores. Nonetheless, the process-paid arrangement continued in other markets around the world. 

Due to the growth and popularity of alternative photographic materials, its complex processing requirements, and the widespread transition to digital photography, Kodachrome lost market share. Its manufacture was discontinued in 2009, and processing ended in December 2010.

In early 2017, Kodak announced they were investigating the possibility of reintroducing Kodachrome, but later conceded that this was unlikely to happen.

Background

Kodachrome was the first color film that used a subtractive color method to be successfully mass-marketed. Previous materials, such as Autochrome and Dufaycolor, had used the additive screenplate methods. Until its discontinuation, Kodachrome was the oldest surviving brand of color film. It was manufactured for 74 years in various formats to suit still and motion picture cameras, including 8 mm, Super 8, 16 mm for movies (exclusively through Eastman Kodak), and 35 mm for movies (exclusively through Technicolor Corp as "Technicolor Monopack") and 35 mm, 120, 110, 126, 828 and large format for still photography.

Kodachrome is appreciated in the archival and professional market for its dark-storage longevity. Because of these qualities, it was used by professional photographers such as Steve McCurry, David Alan Harvey, Peter Guttman and Alex Webb. McCurry used Kodachrome for his 1984 portrait of Sharbat Gula, Afghan Girl, for the National Geographic magazine. It was used by Walton Sound and Film Services in the UK in 1953 for the official 16 mm film of the coronation of Elizabeth II of the United Kingdom. Copies of the film for sale to the public were also produced using Kodachrome.

History

Before Kodachrome
Before Kodachrome film was marketed in 1935, most color photography had been achieved using additive methods and materials such as Autochrome and Dufaycolor, which were the first practical color processes. These had several disadvantages because they used a réseau filter made from discrete color elements that were visible upon enlargement. The finished transparencies absorbed between 70% and 80% of light upon projection, requiring very bright projection lamps, especially for large projections. Using the subtractive method, these disadvantages could be avoided.

First use of 'Kodachrome' name
The first Kodak product called Kodachrome was invented by John Capstaff in 1913. His Kodachrome was a subtractive process that used only two colours: blue-green and red-orange. It required two glass plate negatives, one made using a panchromatic emulsion and a red filter, the other made using an emulsion insensitive to red light. The two plates could be exposed as a "bipack" (sandwiched emulsion to emulsion, with a very thin red filter layer between), which eliminated the need for multiple exposures or a special colour camera. After development, the silver images were bleached out with chemistry that hardened the bleached portions of the gelatin. Using dyes that were absorbed only by the unhardened gelatin, the negative that recorded the blue and green light was dyed red-orange and the red-exposed negative was dyed blue-green. The result was a pair of positive dye images. The plates were then assembled emulsion to emulsion, producing transparency that was capable of surprisingly good (for a two-colour process) colour rendition of skin tones in portraits. Capstaff's Kodachrome was made commercially available in 1915. It was also adapted for use as a 35 mm motion picture film process.
Today, this first version of Kodachrome is nearly forgotten, completely overshadowed by the next Kodak product bearing the name Kodachrome.

In 2012, Capstaff's early film tests were added to the United States Library of Congress National Film Registry under the title Two-Color Kodachrome Test Shots No. III (1922) for being “culturally, historically or aesthetically” significant."

Development of modern Kodachrome

The next version of Kodachrome was invented in the early 1930s by two professional musicians, Leopold Godowsky Jr. and Leopold Mannes, who were also university-trained scientists.

Mannes and Godowsky first took an interest in color photography when in 1917, still high school pupils at the time, they saw a movie called Our Navy, a movie made using a four-color additive process. Both agreed the color was terrible. After reading up on the subject in the library they started to experiment with additive color processes. Their experiments were continued during their college years, eventually producing a camera having two lenses that projected images side by side on a single strip of film. The color rendition of this additive two-color process was not too bad, but aligning the two lenses of the projector was difficult.

Their experiments, which continued after they finished college, turned from multiple lenses that produced multiple, differently colored images that had to be combined to form the final transparency, to multiple layered film in which the different color images were already combined, perfectly aligned.
Such a multi-layered film had already been invented and patented in 1912 by the German inventor Rudolph Fischer. Each of the three layers in the proposed film would be sensitive to one of the three primary colors, and each of the three layers would have substances (called "color couplers") embedded in them that would form a dye of the required color when combined with the by-products of the developing silver image. When the silver images were bleached away, the three-color dye image would remain. Fischer himself did not find a way to stop the color couplers and color sensitizing dyes from wandering from one layer into the other, where they would produce unwanted colors.

Mannes and Godowsky followed that route, started experimenting with color couplers, but their experiments were hindered by a lack of money, supplies and facilities. In 1922 Robert Wood, a friend of Mannes, wrote a letter to Kodak chief scientist Kenneth Mees, introducing Mannes and Godowsky and their experiments, and asking if Mees could let them use the Kodak facilities for a few days. Mees offered to help, and after meeting with Mannes and Godowsky agreed to supply them with multi-layer emulsions made to Mannes and Godowsky's specifications. Financial aid, in the form of a $20,000 loan, was supplied by the investment firm Kuhn, Loeb and Company, who had Mannes and Godowsky's experiments brought to their attention by a secretary working for that firm Mannes had acquainted.

By 1924 they were able to patent a two-color process. The important part of that patented process was a process called controlled diffusion. By timing how long it took for an image to form in the top layer, but not yet in the next layer beneath that one, they began to solve the problem that Fischer could not. Using this time-controlled way of processing one layer at a time, they could create the dye image of the required color in only that layer in which it was required. Some three years later they were still experimenting using this controlled diffusion method of separating the colors in the multi-layer emulsion, but by then they had decided that instead of incorporating the color couplers into the emulsion layers themselves, they could be added to the developing chemicals, solving the problem of wandering color couplers. The only part left of Fischer's original problem with a multi-layer emulsion were the wandering sensitizing dyes.

In 1929 money ran out, and Mees decided to help them once more. Mees knew that the solution to the problem of the wandering dyes had already been found by one of Kodak's own scientists, Leslie Brooker. So he gave Mannes and Godowsky enough money to pay off the loan Kuhn Loeb had supplied and offered them a yearly salary. He also gave them a three-year deadline to come up with a finished and commercially viable product.

Not long before the three-year period would expire, at the end of 1933, Mannes and Godowsky still had not managed to come up with anything usable, and thought their experiments would be terminated by Kodak. Their only chance for survival was to invent something in a hurry, something that the company could put into production and capitalise. Mees, however, granted them a one-year extension and, still having technical challenges they needed to solve, they eventually presented Mees with a two-color movie process in 1934. The original Kodachrome invented by John Capstaff some 20 years earlier was also two-color.

Mees immediately set things in motion to produce and market this film, but just before Kodak was about to introduce the two-color film in 1935, Mannes and Godowsky completed work on the long-awaited but no longer expected, much better, three-color version. On April 15, 1935, this new film, borrowing the name from Capstaff's process, was formally announced.

Launch and later history

Kodachrome was first sold in 1935 as 16 mm movie film with an ASA speed of 10 and the following year it was made available as 8 mm movie film, and in 35mm and 828 formats for still cameras.

In 1961 Kodak released Kodachrome II with sharper images and faster speeds at 25 ASA. In 1962, Kodachrome-X at ASA 64 was introduced.
In 1974, with the transition to the K-14 process, Kodachrome II and Kodachrome-X were replaced by Kodachrome 25 and Kodachrome 64.

Until manufacturing was taken over by rival film manufacturer GAF, View-Master stereo reels used Kodachrome films.

Decline and discontinuation
Later color transparency films, such as Agfachrome, Anscochrome, Fujichrome and Kodak's own Ektachrome used simpler, quicker, and more accessible color development processes. Their higher film speeds also eroded Kodachrome's market share, as the quality of competing films improved over time. As digital photography reduced the demand for all film after 2000, Kodachrome sales further declined. On June 22, 2009, Kodak announced it would no longer manufacture Kodachrome film, citing declining demand. During its heyday, many Kodak and independent laboratories processed Kodachrome, but by 2010, only one Kodak-certified facility remained: Dwayne's Photo in Parsons, Kansas. On July 14, 2010, it was announced that the last roll of Kodachrome manufactured had been developed by Dwayne's for photographer Steve McCurry, a National Geographic photographer. McCurry had asked Kodak for the last roll in stock, then went out on his own to use that roll. Although McCurry retains ownership of the slides, prints of the 36 exposures are permanently housed at the George Eastman House in Rochester, New York and most of the pictures have been published on the Internet by Vanity Fair magazine.

2017 reintroduction rumors

After announcing the return of Ektachrome at the beginning of 2017, Eastman Kodak CMO Steven Overman told The Kodakery podcast, "we are investigating Kodachrome, looking at what it would take to bring that back". Although the statement generated widespread media interest, it was subsequently conceded by an official at Kodak Alaris (who would be responsible for its production and sale) that the return of Kodachrome was probably impractical (due to the difficulty in restoring the now-dismantled infrastructure needed to support it) and therefore unlikely.

Characteristics

Emulsion 
Kodachrome films are non-substantive. Unlike substantive transparency and negative color films, Kodachrome film does not incorporate dye couplers into the emulsion layers. The dye couplers are added during processing. This means that Kodachrome emulsion layers are thinner and less light is scattered upon exposure, meaning that the film could record an image with more sharpness than substantive films. Transparencies made with non-substantive films have an easily visible relief image on the emulsion side of the film. Kodachrome 64 and 200 can record a dynamic range of about 2.3D or 8 stops, as shown in the characteristic curves. Kodachrome transparencies have a dynamic range of around 12 stops, or 3.6–3.8D.

Color
The color rendering of Kodachrome films was unique in color photography for several decades after its introduction in the 1930s. Even after the introduction of other successful professional color films, such as Fuji Velvia, some professionals continued to prefer Kodachrome, and maintain that it still has certain advantages over digital. Steve McCurry told Vanity Fair magazine:

Contrast
Kodachrome is generally used for direct projection using white light. As such, it possesses a relatively high contrast.

For professional uses, where duplication is expected and required, a special version, Kodachrome Commercial (KCO), was available in a 35 mm BH-perforated base (exclusively through Technicolor) and in a 16 mm base (exclusively through Eastman Kodak's professional products division). In both cases, Eastman Kodak performed the processing.

Kodachrome Commercial has a low-contrast characteristic that complements the various duplication films with which it is intended to be used: silver separation negatives for 35 mm (controlled exclusively by Technicolor) and reversal duplicating and printing stocks for 16 mm (controlled exclusively by Eastman Kodak).

Kodachrome Commercial was available until the mid-1950s, after which Ektachrome Commercial (ECO) replaced it for these specific applications.

After the late 1950s, 16 mm Kodachrome Commercial-originated films (and Ektachrome Commercial-originated films as well) were quite often duplicated onto Eastmancolor internegative film, after which these films were printed on Eastmancolor positive print film, as a cost-reduction measure, thereby yielding relatively low-cost prints for direct projection.

Archival stability
When stored in darkness, Kodachrome's long-term stability under suitable conditions is superior to other types of color film of the same era. While existing Kodachrome materials from before Kodak simplified the development process in 1938 are almost always faded, images on Kodachrome slides and motion picture films made after this point retain accurate color and density to this day. It has been calculated that the yellow dye, the least stable, would suffer a 20% loss of dye in 185 years. This is because developed Kodachrome does not retain unused color couplers. Nevertheless, Kodachrome's color stability under bright light, for example during projection, is inferior to substantive slide films. Kodachrome's fade time under projection is about one hour, compared to Fujichrome's two and a half hours.

Unprocessed Kodachrome film may survive long periods between exposure and processing. In one case, several rolls were exposed and then lost in a Canadian forest. Upon discovery 19 years later they were processed and the slides were usable.

Digital scanning and resolution 
A 35mm Kodachrome transparency, like other 35mm transparencies on films of comparable ISO rating, contains an equivalent of approximately 20 megapixels of data in the 24 mm x 36 mm image. Scanning Kodachrome transparencies can be problematic because of the film's tendency to scan with a blue color cast. Some software producers deliver special Kodachrome color profiles with their software to avoid this. An IT8 calibration with a special Kodachrome calibration target is necessary for accurate color reproduction.

Many scanners use an additional infrared channel to detect defects, as the long wave infrared radiation passes through the film but not through dust particles. Dust, scratches, and fingerprints on the slide are typically detected and removed by a scanner's software. Kodachrome interacts with this infrared channel in two ways. The absorption of the cyan dye extends into the near infrared region, making this layer opaque to infrared radiation. Kodachrome also has a pronounced relief image that can affect the infrared channel. These effects can sometimes cause a slight loss of sharpness in the scanned image when Digital ICE or a similar infrared channel dust removal function is used.

Processing 

Kodachrome, and other non-substantive films, unlike most color films, required complex processing that could not practicably be carried out by amateurs. The process underwent four significant alterations since its inception. The final version of the process, designated K-14, was introduced in 1974. The process was complex and exacting, requiring technicians with extensive chemistry training and large, complex machinery. This is because most color films contain dye couplers in the film itself; during development the couplers react with the developer to form the dyes that form the final image. Kodachrome film has no such couplers; instead the dyes are formed on the film by a complex processing sequence that required four different developers; one black and white developer, and three color developers. Normal color film requires just one developer. Also, processing Kodachrome film requires 8 or more tanks of processing chemicals, each of which must be precisely controlled for concentration, temperature and agitation, resulting in very complex processing equipment with precise chemical control, no small feat for small processing companies.

The first step in the process was the removal of the antihalation backing with an alkaline solution and wash. The film was then developed using a developer containing phenidone and hydroquinone, which formed three superimposed negative images, one for each primary color. After the first developer was washed out, the film underwent re-exposure and redevelopment. Re-exposure fogged the silver halides that were not developed in the first developer, limiting development to one layer at a time. A color developer then developed the fogged image, and its exhaustion products reacted with a color coupler to form a dye in the color complementary to the layer's sensitivity. The red-sensitive layer was re-exposed through the base of the film with red light, then redeveloped forming cyan dye. The blue-sensitive layer was re-exposed through the emulsion side of the film with blue light, then redeveloped forming yellow dye. The green-sensitive layer was redeveloped with a developer that chemically fogged it and formed magenta dye. After color development, the metallic silver was converted to silver halide using a bleach solution. The film was then fixed, making these silver halides soluble and leaving only the final dye image. The final steps were to wash the film to remove residual chemicals that might cause deterioration of the dye image, then to dry, cut, and mount the film in slide frames.

Prepaid processing
Due to its complex processing requirements, Kodachrome film was initially sold at a price that included processing by Kodak. An envelope was included with the film in which the photographer would send the exposed film to the nearest of several designated Kodak laboratories. The film was processed, mounted in  cardboard mounts in the case of 35 mm slides, and returned by mail to the sender. After 1954, as a result of a lawsuit from the federal government, this practice was prohibited in the United States as anticompetitive. Kodak entered into a consent decree that ended this practice in the United States, and allowed independent processing laboratories to acquire the chemicals needed to process Kodachrome films.  In other countries, the price of Kodachrome film continued to include processing by Kodak.

Decline
The use of transparency film declined in the 1980s and 1990s, which, combined with competition from Fuji's Velvia slide film, caused a drop in Kodachrome sales. Some business analysts speculated that heavy subsidies by the Japanese government propped up Fuji and may have even allowed dumping of Fuji's films at below the cost to manufacture them. Kodachrome products were gradually discontinued and on June 22, 2009, Kodak announced that the remaining film, Kodachrome 64, would no longer be manufactured.

Because of the decline in business, many Kodak-owned and independent Kodachrome processing facilities were closed. The loss of processing availability further accelerated the decline in Kodachrome sales. In 1999, Kodak attempted to increase the availability of K-14 processing through its K-Lab program, where small labs equipped with smaller Kodak processing machines would supplement Kodak's own processing services. This effort did not endure and all the K-labs were closed by 2005.

On July 25, 2006, extensive documentation about Kodak's Lausanne Kodachrome lab's impending closure was sent to the European Parliament by the Dutch office of the European Parliament because, although located in Switzerland, the facility served all of Europe and its closure would affect European photographers. The Parliamentary committees for Culture and Education and for Internal Market and Consumer Protection studied the matter.

Cessation of processing
After its Lausanne processing facility closed, Kodak subcontracted the processing work to Dwayne's Photo, an independent facility in the United States, which became the world's last Kodachrome processing facility. Dwayne's processing of 35 mm films was fully endorsed by Kodak, but its Super-8 process was not endorsed because it required more agitation. Films sent for processing in the USA were mailed directly to Dwayne's, while those in Europe were sent to the Lausanne facility's address and forwarded to Dwayne's.

Dwayne's Photo announced in late 2010 that it would process all Kodachrome rolls received at the lab by December 30, 2010, after which processing would cease. As Dwayne's final processing deadline approached, thousands of stored rolls of film were sent in for processing. Once film received by the deadline had been developed, the world's last K-14 processing machine was taken out of service. The final roll to be processed was exposed by Dwayne Steinle, owner of Dwayne's Photo. The cessation of processing by Dwayne's Photo is commemorated in the book Kodachrome – End of the Run: Photographs from the Final Batches, edited by photographers Bill Barrett and Susan Hacker Stang with introductory essays by famed Time magazine worldwide pictures editor Arnold Drapkin and Dwayne's Photo vice president Grant Steinle. The book presents a year of pictures shot by Webster University photography students on more than 100 rolls of by-then rare Kodachrome film and processed by Dwayne's on the last day (extended to January 18, 2011) before processing chemicals officially ceased production. Kodachrome film can no longer be processed in color, but it can be processed in black and white by some labs that specialize in obsolete processes and old film processing.

Discontinuation

The Kodachrome product range diminished progressively through the 1990s and 2000s.

 Kodachrome 64 film in 120 format was discontinued in 1996.
 Kodachrome 25 was discontinued in 2002.
 Kodachrome 40 in the Super 8 movie format was discontinued in June 2005, despite protests from filmmakers. Kodak launched a replacement color reversal film in the Super 8 format, Ektachrome 64T, which uses the common E-6 processing chemistry.
 Kodachrome 200 was discontinued in November 2006.
 Kodachrome 64 and Kodachrome 64 Professional  135 format were discontinued in June 2009.

Product timeline

In popular culture
Kodachrome was the subject of Paul Simon's 1973 song "Kodachrome", and Kodachrome Basin State Park in Utah was named after it, becoming the only park named for a brand of film.

In 2017 the film Kodachrome premiered at the Toronto International Film Festival and featured a dying photographer, played by Ed Harris, whose son, played by Jason Sudeikis, helps him to get the last of his Kodachrome photography processed.

See also
 135 film

References

External links
Two-Color Kodachrome Test Shots No. III essay by James Layton  at National Film Registry
George Eastman House Museum: – "Saying "farewell" while celebrating 75 years of Kodachrome"
 Library of Congress Preservation/Restoration Resources for Kodachrome
 Kodachrome on Timeline of Historical Film Colors with many written resources and many photographs of Kodachrome prints.

Products introduced in 1935
Kodak photographic films
Products and services discontinued in 2009

ja:リバーサルフィルム#コダクローム